is a junction railway station in the city of Takahata, Yamagata, Japan, operated by the East Japan Railway Company (JR East). It is unique in having an onsen hot spa on its premises.

Lines
Takahata Station is served by the Yamagata Shinkansen and Ōu Main Line, and is located 49.9 kilometers from the starting point of both lines at Fukushima Station.

Station layout
Takahata Station has two opposed side platforms connected via a footbridge. The station has a Midori no Madoguchi staffed ticket office.

Platforms

History
It was renamed Takahata on 16 March 1991.

Passenger statistics
In fiscal 2018, the station was used by an average of 844 passengers daily (boarding passengers only).

Surrounding area

 Takahata Winery

See also
List of railway stations in Japan

References

External links

 JR East Station information 

Stations of East Japan Railway Company
Railway stations in Yamagata Prefecture
Yamagata Shinkansen
Ōu Main Line
Railway stations in Japan opened in 1900
Takahata, Yamagata